The 1932 Tour de Hongrie was the seventh edition of the Tour de Hongrie cycle race and was held from 29 June to 3 July 1932. The race started and finished in Budapest. The race was won by József Vitéz.

Route

General classification

References

1932
Tour de Hongrie
Tour de Hongrie